The 135th Pennsylvania House of Representatives District is located in the Lehigh Valley and has been represented since 1999 by Steve Samuelson.

District profile
The 135th Pennsylvania House of Representatives District is located in Northampton County. It includes Moravian College and Lehigh University. It is made up of the following areas:

 Bethlehem (Northampton County Portion)
 Hanover Township (PART, Districts 01, 02, 03, 04, and 06)

Representatives

Recent election results

References

External links
District map from the United States Census Bureau
Pennsylvania House Legislative District Maps from the Pennsylvania Redistricting Commission.  
Population Data for District 135 from the Pennsylvania Redistricting Commission.

Government of Northampton County, Pennsylvania
135